Freedom of peaceful assembly, sometimes used interchangeably with the freedom of association, is the individual right or ability of people to come together and collectively express, promote, pursue, and defend their collective or shared ideas. The right to freedom of association is recognized as a human right, a political right and a civil liberty.

The terms freedom of assembly and freedom of association may be used to distinguish between the freedom to assemble in public places and the freedom to join an association. Freedom of assembly is often used in the context of the right to protest, while freedom of association is used in the context of labor rights and in the Constitution of the United States is interpreted to mean both the freedom to assemble and the freedom to join an association.

Human rights instruments
Freedom of assembly is included in, among others, the following human rights instruments:
 Universal Declaration of Human Rights – Article 20
 International Covenant on Civil and Political Rights – Article 21
 European Convention on Human Rights – Article 11
 American Convention on Human Rights – Article 15

National and regional constitutions that recognize freedom of assembly include:
 Bangladesh – Articles 37 and 38 of the Constitution of Bangladesh guarantee the freedom of association and assembly.
 Brazil – Article 5 of the Constitution of Brazil
 Canada – S. 2 of the Canadian Charter of Rights and Freedoms which forms part of the Constitution Act, 1982
 France – Article 431-1 of the Nouveau Code Pénal
 Germany – Article 8 GG (Grundgesetz, Basic Law)
 Hungary – Article VIII (1) of the Fundamental Law
 India – Fundamental Rights in India
Indonesia – Article 28E(3) of the Constitution of Indonesia
 Ireland – Article 40.6.1° of the Constitution, as enumerated under the heading "Fundamental Rights"
 Italy – Article 17 of the Constitution
 Japan – Article 21 of the Constitution of Japan
 Macau Basic Law - Article 27
 Malaysia – Article 10 of the Constitution of Malaysia
 Mexico – Article 9 of the Constitution of Mexico
 New Zealand – Section 16 New Zealand Bill of Rights Act 1990
 Norway – Section 101 of the Constitution of Norway 
 Pakistan - Article 16 of the Constitution of Pakistan, 1973
 Philippines – Article III, Section 4 of the Constitution of the Philippines
 Poland – Article 57 of the Constitution of Poland
 Russia – Articles 30 and 31 of the Constitution of Russia guarantee the freedom of association and peaceful assembly.
 South Africa Bill of Rights –  Article 17
 Spain – Article 21 of the Spanish Constitution of 1978
 Sweden – Chapter 2 of The Instrument of Government
 Taiwan (Republic of China) – Article 14 guarantees freedom of assembly and association.
 Turkey – Articles 33 and 34 of the Constitution of Turkey guarantee the freedom of association and assembly.
 UAE – The UAE Constitution protects freedom of peaceful assembly.
 United States – First Amendment to the Constitution of the United States

See also

 Free speech zone
 Right to protest
 Strategy-31
 Unlawful assembly
 United Nations Special Rapporteur on the Rights to Freedom of Peaceful Assembly and of Association

References

External links

 Guidelines on Freedom of Peaceful Assembly OSCE/ODIHR, 2007
 Guidelines on Freedom of Peaceful Assembly (2nd edition) Venice Commission and OSCE/ODIHR, 2010

 
Human rights by issue